Clive Jones may refer to:

 Clive Jones (Doctor Who), a character on the British TV series Doctor Who
 Clive Jones (rugby), Welsh rugby union and rugby league footballer of the 1970s